Peripatopsis balfouri is a species of velvet worm in the Peripatopsidae family. This species has 18 pairs of clawed legs (with the last pair more reduced in the male than in the female). Also known as the blue velvet worm, this species ranges from 9 mm to 22 mm in length. The type locality is in South Africa.

References

Further reading 
 

Endemic fauna of South Africa
Onychophorans of temperate Africa
Onychophoran species
Animals described in 1885